Åland University of Applied Sciences (HÅ) is a university of applied sciences (a polytechnic) in Mariehamn, Åland. It is housed in three different buildings, the North building (Neptunigatan 17), the Western Building (Neptunigatan 6) and the South Building (Navigationsskolegränd 2). It has approx. 550 full-time students, mainly from Åland and Sweden. The number of employees is around 60. Åland UAS is maintained by the Government of Åland. It is the only higher education institution in the Åland Islands. The education in the Åland University of Applied Sciences is conducted in Swedish.

History 
Åland UAS is a merging of several schools, of which all have a long history in higher education in Åland. The Master Mariner education goes back to the middle of the nineteenth century, when the education in navigation started in Åland. The School of Navigation (Navigationsskolan), which changed its name to The Åland Institute of Marine Technology (Ålands sjöfartsläroverk) in 1943, incorporated in the 1930s a study programme for mechanical engineering. The mechanical engineering programme became a school of its own in 1968,  called The Åland School of Technology (Ålands tekniska skola) and later, in 1988, The Åland Institute of Technology (Ålands tekniska högskola). A study programme of automation system engineering (electrotechnical engineering) was included in the Åland School of Technology in 1984.

The Åland Polytechnic started as a pilot scheme in 1997. It was a collaboration between the Åland Institute of Technology, the Åland Institute of Marine Technology, the Åland Institute of Business Education, the Åland Institute of Hotel and Restaurant Education and the Åland Institute of Health Care Education.

Åland UAS was established on January 1, 2003, through a consolidation between the Åland Polytechnic and the Åland Open University. At the same time The Åland Institute of Technology and The Åland Institute of Marin Technic ceased to exist and were incorporated in Åland UAS. The Åland Open University was renamed The Open University and became a part of Åland UAS.

Degree Programmes 
Åland University of Applied Sciences offers seven degree programmes; Business Administration, Electrotechnical Engineering, Health and Caring Sciences, Hospitality Management, Information Technology, Marine Engineering and Marine Technology.

The Open University 

The Open University is a part of the Åland UAS. The Open University offers courses at university level in cooperation with other universities. The number of course participants during 2020 was 2198. The Open University was established on June 1, 1969, as The Summer University of Åland, later The Åland University.

Library 

The library of the Åland UAS is located in the same building as the Mariehamn City Library. The materials of the university library are integrated in that of the Mariehamn City Library's, with the exception of the course literature which constitutes an own section in the library - the course book library. In addition to books, the university library also offers guidance in information search for students.

Research 
The Åland UAS conducts both basic and applied research, which benefits the teaching as well as the local community. The teachers conduct research within their area of expertise in collaboration with national and international partners. The core areas of research are electrotechnical engineering and health and caring sciences.

Internationalisation 
Internationalisation work is an integral part of the Åland UAS. The Åland UAS offers exchange programs at other partner universities for both students and staff. For students this mainly consists of exchange studies within the Nordic countries or Europe or international internships all over the world. Teachers and other staff have the opportunity to take part in exchange programs with our partner universities. Visiting guest lecturers from partner universities and companies add to the international atmosphere. The Åland UAS also participates in a number of international projects and in the Erasmus+ and Nordplus programmes for higher education.

Student union 
The student union at Åland UAS is called SkÅHla. They represent the common interests of students in the decision-making bodies of the university and arrange social events and other pastime activities for students.

See also

 Alandica Shipping Academy

External links
Åland University of Applied Sciences
The Åland University of Applied Sciences Library
The Open University

References 

Universities and colleges in Finland
Educational institutions established in 2003
Universities and colleges formed by merger in Finland
2003 establishments in Finland
Organisations based in Åland
Maritime colleges